The  is a large automobile produced by Nissan since 1960. It was developed to provide upscale transportation, competing with the Prince Skyline and Gloria which were later merged into the Nissan family. In later years, the Nissan Skyline was positioned as a sports sedan/coupe, whereas the Nissan Gloria was turned into a sporty version of the Cedric (with identical styling but using a different radiator grille and front & rear light clusters).

In Japan, the Cedric/Gloria series was affectionately called CedGlo, and this long-running series finally came to an end in October 2004, replaced by the Nissan Fuga. The Cedric name is still in use, on the Y31 series fleet vehicle traditionally used as a taxi, where it competes with the Toyota Comfort, and is still in production. Throughout the many versions of the Cedric, it was always considered to be the prime competitor to the Toyota Crown. The hood ornament was inspired by the diamond pattern used by Lincoln but was changed to two right angles set next to each other.

During the 1970s, it briefly saw other Japanese competitors introduce large sedans: the Mitsubishi Debonair, while the Isuzu Statesman de Ville and the Mazda Roadpacer were derived from General Motors-Australia products and were short-lived. In 1985 Honda introduced its rival to Cedric called Legend, which influence the Japanese car makers that time to update their luxury car line up. 

The Cedric name was inspired by the main character, Cedric, in Frances Hodgson Burnett's novel Little Lord Fauntleroy by the Nissan CEO at the time Katsuji Kawamata.



First generation 30

The first Cedric was the "30" series, introduced in March 1960 and produced through 1962. It was available only at Japanese Nissan dealerships called Nissan Cedric Store. It was the first product labeled as a Nissan, but shared mechanicals with Datsun products built at the time.

Several models were available, including the Cedric 1500 DeLuxe and Standard (30), Cedric 1900 Deluxe (D30, powered by the 1.9 L Nissan H engine), Cedric 1900 Custom (G30, also powered by the Nissan H engine), Cedric Van (V30, six-seater) and the Cedric Wagon (WP30, eight-seater). Only the Cedric Standard used a 1.5 L (1,488 cc) G-series I4 engine which produced . A four-speed manual transmission with the top three gears synchronized was standard, with a three-speed manual fitted to 1900 versions. Diesel engines were supplied by newly acquired Minsei Diesel Industries, Ltd, which was renamed Nissan Diesel Motor Co., Ltd in 1960. All four-cylinder engines were shared with the redesigned Nissan Junior and Nissan Caball.

The Cedric replaced the Austin A50 Nissan was building under license from Austin Motor Company of England, which was called the Nissan Austin, and also benefited from earlier vehicles built by Nissan, called the Datsun DB Series. The six-seater Cedric introduced Nissan's first monocoque body and a wrap-around windshield. The first Cedric featured two stacked headlights on either side of a large grille (inspired by a late 1950s commuter train from Japan, the Tobu JNR 151). The taillights were the same as the Datsun Bluebird 312.  and was considered a six-seater. April 1962 saw the introduction of a station wagon–van, able to seat eight people. The twin-stacked headlight approach, which first appeared on large North American and European vehicles in the late 1950s, was a novel approach to suggest size and luxurious accommodations, and was also used on the 1961 Isuzu Bellel.

31 Series
The "31" series was produced from 1962 until 1965. The models from the 30 series carried over to the 31 series with the addition of a few new models including the Cedric 1900 Standard (G31S) and a 2.0 L four-cylinder SD20 diesel (QGS31) from June 1964. Also new was a three-speed automatic transmission, sourced from Borg Warner, which was offered from July 1964. The new front with its horizontally mounted quad headlights shows a resemblance to the 1956 Rambler and made the car  longer. In 1965, the pressed-steel tappet cover (valve cover) was replaced with an alloy version (same as the CSP311 Silvia). The taillights were smaller, and resembled MG units. All models were equipped with white wall tires. The Cedric was updated again in 1964 with a new dashboard, an alternator rather than a generator, and a new starter system. The Cedric 1500 Standard, first introduced in October 1962, was dropped after 1964. The last change was the adoption of a new grille for the 1965 model year.

Cedric Special 50

The Cedric Special was produced between 1963 and 1965 as competition to the Toyota Crown, Isuzu Bellel, Mitsubishi Debonair and Prince Gloria. Production began in time for the 1964 Summer Olympics held in Tokyo in October 1964.

It was a long-wheelbase version of the H31 series Cedric Custom, lengthened  to fit the  2.8-litre K-Series straight-six engine (an H engine with two extra cylinders). The grille is different from the one on the 31 series; it features a badge that said "Cedric Special", and the Cedric Star emblem. The side badges said "Cedric" and "Special". On the trunk lid (on the left side) is a "2800" badge, on the right side is a "Cedric Special" badge. The gold trim pieces on the hood were longer, and there was wheel arch and sill trim that was unique to the Cedric Special. The front bumper design is also different, with a raised section in the middle above the license plate. Due to the larger 2.8 L engine used in the Cedric Special, Japanese buyers are liable for a higher annual road tax which added to its exclusivity.

The interior was slightly more luxurious than the Custom. The only component that was identical to the Custom were the tail lights. The Mark I Special was produced in 1963, and was replaced by the Mark II in 1964. The Mark II was mostly the same as the Mark I except for a redesigned dashboard, new grille design (gold Cedric Star emblem and separate gold letters spelling "Special"), and rectangular reflectors below the tail lights (replacing the round reflectors used on the Mark I). An automatic transmission, the Borg-Warner 35, became available starting with the Mark II. The Mark II was produced in 1963 and 1964, and was replaced by the Mark III Special in 1964. The Mark III featured a new grille and tail lights from the 1965 31 Series Cedric. The Mark III Cedric Special was replaced by the Nissan President in 1965.

Second generation 130
 

Produced from 1965 through 1971, the P130 Cedric had Pininfarina bodywork and several new engine options on an all-new dedicated platform. Nissan's first OHC engine, the L20, was introduced in this generation Cedric. The modernized appearance was influenced by other Japanese luxury sedans of the period that introduced sleek, squared, and angular sedans, like the 1962 Toyota Crown and the 1964 Mitsubishi Debonair. Its appearance was not shared with the flagship luxury sedan Nissan President and this generation of Cedric was now only available at "Nissan Bluebird Stores" when the President became the flagship at "Nissan Motor Stores".

In August 1966, Nissan Motor Company and Prince Motor Company merged. Starting in 1967, the Cedric was sold in various export markets, as the Datsun 2000/2300/2400 rather than "Nissan Cedric".

There were three body styles available: a four-door sedan, five-door station wagon (Wagon Six from 1967, WP130, later WH130) and a five-door van (Van Six from 1968, also as Van Deluxe Six for 1970, VP130, later VH130)

Trim levels offered were the four-cylinder 130 (later called Standard) for 1966–1967, as 130S for 1968–1970. The Deluxe Six (P130, 1967.5-1970), Custom Six (P130D, dropped after 1966, reintroduced in 1970 as H130V), Standard (later called Personal Six, P130S, G130S), Personal Deluxe Six (G130Q, H130Q, replaced Personal Six for 1970), Standard Diesel (later called Diesel, Q130), and Special Six (also called Super Six, H130 for 1966–1967, G130 for 1969–1970, G130V for 1968 Super Six). In 1967, there were 68 model variations of the Cedric.

Unique to this generation, Nissan produced a police car installed with the Y40 V8 engine, and was the only time Nissan installed a V8 engine in the Cedric.

Engines:
 1966–1971 2.0 L (1,983 cc) H20 OHV I4, 99 hp (74 kW) (4 Cylinder/Standard)
 1966–1968 2.0 L (1,973 cc) J20 OHV I6, 109 hp (81 kW) (Deluxe, P130D Custom, P130S Personal Six, WP130 Wagon and Van)
 1966–1968 2.0 L (1,998 cc) L20 OHC twin-carb I6, 123 hp (92 kW) (H130 Special Six and H130 Super Six)
 1969 2.3 L (2,263 cc) L23 OHC I6, 123 hp (92 kW) (1969 G130S Special Six, 1969 "G130S Personal Six" and 1969 G130V Super Six)
 1970–1971 2.0 L (1,998 cc) L20 OHC I6, 112 hp (84 kW) (H130V Custom, H130Q Personal Deluxe Six, WH130 Wagon, and Van)
 1970–1971 2.4 L (2,393 cc) L24 OHC I6, 130 hp (97 kW) (G130Q Personal Deluxe, G130 Special Six, and G130 Super Six)
 1965–1971 2.2 L (1,991 cc) SD20 OHV Diesel I4, 70 hp (51 kW) (Diesel)

This was the first Cedric that was available in versions no longer regarded as compact sedans under Japanese vehicle classification regulations, since the engines' displacement exceeded two litres.

Third generation 230

The 230 series was released in 1971 and was produced through 1975. The Cedric was now being built at the Tochigi factory location. The suspension configuration remained the same type as used in the second generation. Front disc brakes were added to the standard equipment list for some versions. The Cedric name was dropped for most export markets, with the car now called the Datsun 200C, 220C, 240C, or 260C. In many European markets this car was only available with the diesel engine, aiming in particular at the taxi market. The Cedric was exclusive to Japanese Nissan dealership network called Nissan Bluebird Store as the senior luxury sedan to the Nissan Bluebird, while the Nissan Gloria, manufactured by the Prince Motor Company, was exclusive to Nissan Prince Store locations after the merger with Nissan, with the Nissan Skyline serving as the junior sedan and coupe to the Gloria.

The 230 series was offered in four-door sedan and wagon, and saw the introduction of a two-door coupé. The coupé "personal luxury car" was introduced as a result of the 1970 Toyota Crown hardtop coupé.

On August 1972, a four-door hardtop sedan, with no B-pillar between the front and rear passenger side windows, was added to the options list. This generation introduced a new appearance, called "coke bottle", which began to appear during the 1960s and 1970s internationally. The four-door hardtop had a standard interior dome light and a secondary fluorescent lamp that extended from the front to rear passenger seats, attached to the ceiling for ambient purposes. The 2.4-litre engine was replaced with a larger 2.6-litre version to conform to emission regulations enacted in April 1973 without losing performance. Vehicles installed with Nissan's new emission control technology, including fuel injected models, could be identified by a NAPS badge on the trunklid. In South Africa, the car was sold as the Datsun 260C with a  version of the L26 engine; this engine (still of 2.6 liters) was upgraded to produce  in late 1975, when the car was somewhat confusingly renamed the Datsun 300C. Both the four-door sedan and two-door hardtop were available, and along with the upgrade the interior was renewed.

The trim levels offered were the 2600 GL, the 2600 Custom Deluxe, and the Deluxe.

Engines:
 2.0 L (1982 cc) H20 OHV I4 – , 140 km/h
 2.0 L (1998 cc) L20A OHC I6 – , 165 km/h  twin-SU carb version (GX): , 170 km/h
 2.4 L (2393 cc) L24 OHC I6 (1971–1972)
 2.6 L (2565 cc) L26 OHC I6 (1972–1975) – 
Diesel:
 2.0 L (1991 cc) SD20 OHV diesel I4
 2.2 L (2164 cc) SD22 OHV diesel I4 – , 125 km/h, 0–100 km/h (62 mph) in 28 sec

Fourth generation 330

The 330 series Cedric was produced from 1975 through 1979. Again, it was sold as the Gloria as well in the domestic Japanese market; in the export it was marketed as the 200C, 220C, 260C, and 280C (after 1978).

The diesel engine returned, mainly for taxi usage. For the same purpose, there was a version of the four-cylinder "H20" petrol engine which ran on LPG. The engines were further modified as emission control regulations were again adjusted in 1976, using the moniker Nissan NAPS.

Trim levels offered were the Deluxe, Custom Deluxe, GL, GL-E, SGL, SGL-E, 2800SGL, and 2800SGL-E. The SGL Brougham also first appeared in this generation. The "SGL" designation stands for Senior Grade Level, and the "E" represents fuel injection. Japanese buyers of the top level "SGL" models were liable for higher road taxes which justified the higher equipment levels and optional features added.

October 1977 saw 1 million Cedrics produced.

Halogen headlights were added in June 1976. As with the 230, the 330 was offered as a Sedan, Wagon/Van, Coupé, and rare pillarless Hardtop Sedan.

Engines:
 2.0 L (1982 cc) H20 OHV I4
 2.0 L (1998 cc) L20A OHC I6
 2.4 L (2393 cc) L24 OHC I6
 2.6 L (2565 cc) L26 OHC I6 (1976–1978)
 2.8 L (2753 cc) L28 OHC I6 (1978–1979)
 2.0 L (1991 cc) SD20 OHV diesel I4
 2.2 L (2164 cc) SD22 OHV diesel I4

Fifth generation 430

The 430 series was produced from 1979 through 1983. Engines largely carried over from the previous generation. Most export markets received the 2.8 L L28 OHC I6 or the new LD28 diesel version, and was called the Datsun 280C. For taxi use in Singapore and Hong Kong, the 2.2-liter diesel engine was still available in what was called the 220C; this model was also sold as a sedan or van in Japan until it was cancelled with the 1981 facelift. This was the first generation Cedric with available four-wheel disc brakes, although drums all around were fitted to the cheapest versions. Styling was achieved with the cooperation of Pininfarina, providing a cleaner image than the previous generation. The rear suspension was upgraded to a rigid link coil system.

Beginning in August 1980, the six-cylinder 2.8-liter diesel was added to the Van and Wagon models in Japan. A lock-up torque converter was added to the four-speed automatic transmission, which was added in June 1982. This new transmission gave considerably better fuel economy, but did necessitate altering the floor plate to provide a wider transmission tunnel. At this time, the L20-engined van received a version of the engine which met the 1981 emissions standards; this model received the new chassis code V431. In February 1983, the "Excellence" trim was added to help sell the last 430 cars before the introduction of the new Y30, fitted with either the turbocharged or the fuel injected L20 engine. This model approached the top Brougham's trim, but in a lower tax bracket and with special two-tone paint.

The 2.0-litre turbocharged L20ET first appeared in the Cedric and its sister car, the Gloria in December 1979, a first for the Japanese market. Production actually began two months earlier. To receive official approval of this engine, Nissan focused attention on the energy saving capacities of the turbo engine. In another first for Japan, the naturally aspirated 280E received electronic fuel injection and the ECCS engine management system. All of these firsts helped the 430-series Cedric/Gloria becoming named Japan's Car of The Year of 1979. The trim level of SGL-F became available with the turbocharged engine from April 1981, which was also when the range received a facelift.

The diesel engine that had been first introduced with the previous generation was complemented by a 2.8 L inline-six diesel, a first for the Japanese market. This, the LD28, was introduced in October 1979, somewhat later than petrol versions, and remained in production until September 1985. It was uncommonly quiet and comfortable for a diesel of this period, and found a large proportion of private buyers. It was originally only available with an automatic transmission; a five-speed model arrived in February 1980 (Vans and Wagons only received the manual option three months later). Mainly for taxi and fleet use the more frugal 2- and 2.2-litre four-cylinder SD-series engines also remained available. These lower-spec models received four round headlights, as did the LPG-powered models with the  L20P engine.

The two-door coupé was no longer offered, and was replaced by the Skyline-based Nissan Leopard luxury sports coupé. A four-door convertible version was made available in small numbers for special use. These were mainly bought by government entities for ceremonial use and was not offered on sale to the general public.

The 430 series Cedric was assembled and sold in Taiwan as the Yue Loong Cedric 2.0 and 2.4. At first codenamed 806, it became the 807 after a minor facelift.

This was the last Cedric to be sold in many European markets, as the more compact (but still roomy) Laurel was now available with the same diesel engine and suited European needs better.

Sixth generation Y30

The Y30 was sold from 1984 through 1987. It used the 3.0 L (2,960 cc) VG30E V6 for the 300C private cars. The diesel engine was used for taxi in Japan, Singapore, and Hong Kong. In Taiwan, the Y30 was sold as the Yue Loong Cedric 811 with a 2-litre four, or as the Cedric 830 with the three-litre VG30 six.

This generation saw the introduction of the VG series V6, which was inspired by an Alfa Romeo design due to a partnership that Nissan and Alfa Romeo had at the time with the Alfa Romeo Arna. The Cedric was offered in three bodystyles; four-door hardtop, four-door sedan and station wagon. The trim level packages were numerous and offered increasing amounts of technology and convenience features on top level platforms. The top level package for the hardtop was called the V30 Turbo Brougham VIP, followed by V30Turbo/V30E Brougham, V20 Turbo Brougham, V20 Turbo/V20E/28D-6 SGL, V20E/28D-6 GL, the V20 Turbo Urban X and the V20 Turbo Urban. The installation of a turbo was to provide better fuel economy and reduce tailpipe emissions as the Japanese pay a tax on the amount of emissions their car produces.

The sedan was meant to target the German luxury executive cars that dominated the class in the 80s (Mercedes S-Class, BMW 7 Series). Trimmed in moquette cloth, the car featured adjustable front seats, adjustable steering wheel, power steering, air conditioning, tinted windows, a LW/MW/FM stereo/cassette player, and the V30 3.0 L V6. The sedan featured the same independent front suspension as the wagon, but had a five-link suspension system for ride quality, and Nissans "Super Sonic Suspension" was also available on hardtop and sedan top trim packages with the ability to switch the ride settings from "Automatic" to "Hard". The sedan trim packages started with the V30 Turbo Brougham VIP, V30 Turbo/V30E Brougham, the V20 Turbo Brougham, the V20 Turbo/V20E/28D-6 SGL, the V20E Custom Deluxe, the Deluxe/28D-6 Deluxe and the Standard.

On the 4-door hardtop, the front driver and passenger seat belt shoulder strap was connected at the top to the ceiling, however, the upper portion could be detached, with the shoulder strap resting on the driver's and front passenger's shoulder without the seat belt hanging from the ceiling. The upper part would then swing up to the ceiling and could be fastened into place. This arrangement provided an additional benefit to the rear seat passenger opposite the driver because the front passenger seat could be pushed forward with the head restraint removed, providing the rear seat passengers an unobstructed view through the front windshield, and both side view windows, adding to the luxurious feel of a hardtop luxury sedan.

The level of comfort, convenience items and chassis technology was vast in relation to other products offered at the time, and the buyer could choose from seemingly endless options. Some of the items included a digitally synthesized AM stereo/FM stereo radio tuner with the ability to listen to broadcast TV stations, and a cassette tape player with recording feature to function as a dictaphone, stereo and cruise control buttons integrated into a fixed position steering wheel hub, and sonar-based backup sensors installed in the rear bumper. Rear seat passengers were also pampered, with the ability to control the stereo and climate control functions from a control pad located at the leading edge of the rear seat armrest, that could be dislodged from the armrest and function as a hand-held remote, along with separate reclining seat and backrest combined with a cellphone located inside the armrest compartment.

The Wagon and Van versions continued in production after the introduction of the succeeding Y31, Y32, and Y33 versions, with the Wagon version ending production in August 1999. The wagon trim packages were the V20E SGL at the top, with an optional DI-NOC woodgrain appearance, the V20E/28D-6 GL, and the V20E Deluxe. Wagons (intended for private buyers) were mainly available with the  VG20E petrol unit and the  RD28 diesel engine (until March 1994).

In 1993, Great Wall was able to make clones of the Y30 under the name CC1020.

Seventh generation Y31

For private use, the Y31 was built from late 1987 through 1991, available as either Sedan or Hardtop versions. This generation was one of Nissan's most popular series, as the Japanese economy was very robust before the advent of the Japanese asset price bubble deflation in mid-1991. The styling of this generation was more rounded, and additional attention was given to luxury accommodations and optional features. The trim packages were similar to the previous generation, with some changes. The top level package for the hardtop was the V30 Turbo Brougham VIP, followed by the V30E Brougham VIP, V30 Brougham, V20 Twincam Turbo Brougham, RD28 Brougham, Classic SV (V20E or RD28 engine), Classic (V20E or RD28 engine), V20 Twincam Turbo Grandturismo SV, V20 Twincam Turbo Granturismo, ending with the V20E Granturismo. The sporty GranTurismo version has short bumpers with body kit, and powered by 2.0-liter VG20DET engine, which replaced the previous generation SGL, GL, while the Classic replaced the Urban designation.

The Sedan version of the Y31 received a light facelift at the launch of the Hardtop Y32, and it was still in production up to 2015 for Japanese rental fleet and taxi markets. The trim packages for the sedan started with the V30 Turbo Brougham VIP, the V30E Brougham VIP, V30E Brougham, V20 Twincam Turbo Brougham, RD28 Brougham, Classic SV (V20E or RD28 engine), Classic (V20E or RD28 engine), with the base model Supercustom (V20E or RD28 engine). The Brougham VIP package had three separate technology upgrade packages (Grade I, II, III), while the Brougham had two for both the sedan and hardtop. There was also a limited edition long-wheelbase model built by Autech.

As before, the options list was extensive. New items that appeared were the replacement of a broadcast TV tuner with a Sony CD player coupled with JBL speakers, a humidifier for back seat passengers, and the replacement of the previous sonar-adjusted suspension by a height-controlled air suspension. A cellular phone continued to be offered, adding hands free convenience by dialing the phone number on an integrated keypad on the stationary steering wheel hub, with the handset located inside the front armrest compartment. In June 1989 the Nissan Cedric with the VG20DET offered the world's first full range electronically controlled 5-speed automatic transmission.

The wagon and van versions of the previous Y30 Cedric remained in production for a while alongside the Y31 sedan and Y32/Y33 Hardtops. The wagon finally ended its run in August 1999, ceding load carrying abilities to the Cedric-based Nissan Presage.

In 1991, a sedan version for fleet use was released. The fleet model Y31 ended production in 2015, and was last updated in 2012.

Engines:
 2.0 L VG20E (VG20P LPG version until 2007.07)
 2.0 L VG20DET (DOHC turbocharged)
 3.0 L VG30E
 3.0 L VG30DE (DOHC)
 3.0 L VG30DET (turbocharged)
 2.0 L RB20P 6-cylinder LPG (until 2002.06)
 2.0 L CA20P 4-cylinder LPG (1987–1991.06)
 2.0 L NA20P/PE 4-cylinder LPG (since 1991.06, NA20PE from 2010.09)
 2.7 L TD27 4-cylinder diesel (Asian exports only, until 2000)
 2.8 L RD28 diesel,  at 4,800 rpm (until 1999.08)
 2.8 L RD28E diesel,  at 4,800 rpm (1999.08–2002.06)
 3.2 L QD32 4-cylinder diesel (Exclusively for Indonesian Silver Bird Taxi fleet)

Eighth generation Y32

The Y32 Cedric, only ever available in a Hardtop version aimed at private buyers, was a reskin of the Y31 model. The Y31 Sedan continued in production alongside the Y32, intended for commercial and institutional uses. The Cedric had a market reputation appealing to an older demographic, while the sister car Nissan Gloria, which has a more performance oriented reputation, aimed for younger buyers. This model shared much of its mechanicals with the newly released Cedric Cima which was a sales success for Nissan. The introduction of the Cima began to siphon off buyers who normally purchased the Brougham and Brougham VIP, with the Cedric Brougham VIP being the rarest. Worldwide the number of VIP Brougham on Japan's Nissan Motors database is less than 17 to date.

The Y32 was produced from June 1991 through 1994. It has had SOHC and DOHC versions of the VG series V6, alongside the inline six Diesel 2.8 version. A four-cylinder engine was never available as the Y32 was only ever marketed in more upscale versions. The performance oriented Gran Turismo reverted to four round headlights, giving the vehicle a similar appearance to the BMW 7 Series sedan sold at the time. Manual transmissions were no longer available. Power window switches were illuminated for easy location at night. The parking brake was no longer operated by center-mounted hand-operated handle, instead relocated to a pedal next to the brake pedal. Interior lighting operates gradually when any door is opened, a shortwave radio tuner is included with the stereo system, and maintenance reminders are also added.

In September 1994 and January of the following year, Granturismo and Brougham versions of the lesser two-litre six-cylinder version were added. Production ended in May 1995 before in June introduction of the succeeding Y33 Cedric Hardtop. The Y31 Sedan remained in production for commercial use.

Engines:
 2.0 L VG20E,  at 6,000 rpm
 3.0 L VG30E,  at 5,200 rpm
 3.0 L VG30DE,  at 6,000 rpm
 3.0 L VG30DET,  at 6,000 rpm
 2.8 L RD28,  at 4,800 rpm

Ninth generation Y33

The Y33 was sold from June 1995 through June 1999. The VG series engine was replaced with the newly developed VQ series (except for the initial lower level versions). AWD ATTESA E-TS, also found on the Skyline, Laurel and Stagea, was added to the options list. One of the major advantages of the VQ series over the VG series was the aluminum alloy block and heads, helping to reduce weight. This generation of the Cedric was also built in LHD for export to Middle East markets. Export versions generally received the VG30E engine, with outputs from  depending on the octane rating.

Engines:
 2.0 L VQ20DE
 2.5 L VQ25DE
 3.0 L VG30E
 3.0 L VQ30DE
 3.0 L VQ30DET
 2.8 L RD28 (series 2)

Tenth generation Y34

The Y34 entered production in June 1999 and lasted through to October 2004.

The line-up consisted of the 250 L and LV (naturally aspirated 2.5-litre V-6), 300LV (naturally aspirated 3-litre V-6) and 300LX/300VIP (3-litre turbo V-6), all with rear-wheel drive; additionally there was the 250 L/LV Four featuring all-wheel drive and a turbocharged version of Nissan's 2.5-litre inline six also seen in the Skyline.

For model year 2000, it won the Automotive Researchers' and Journalists' Conference award in Japan in two categories; Car of the Year and Technology of the Year for the Nissan Extroid CVT transmission.

Direct injection is added to all V6 engines for improved performance and reduced emissions, signified by the "DD" designation in the engine model number. AWD is only available on vehicles equipped with the RB25DET engine. A CVT (a rare case for an RWD-based vehicle) was available on the 300 VIP-Z and 300 LX-ZS trim levels. Top level Cedrics are comparable to the parallel line Nissan Cima, which occupies a market slot just beneath the Nissan President. Autech released a special 40th anniversary version of the Cedric, with the VQ30DET engine.

Satellite guided navigation is added to this generation.

In October 2004, the last Cedric hardtop was built, after which it was replaced by the Nissan Fuga. The Cedric nameplate remained available on the Y31-series sedans for commercial users until 2015.

Prices (in 1999) ranged from ¥3,110,000 for a base 250 L to ¥4,940,000 for the ultra-luxurious 300VIP.

A one-off Y34 roadster built by Nissan for the Tokyo Yakult Swallows for use as a bullpen car remains in use as of 2017.

Nissan Cedric in fiction

Older models of the Cedric appeared in many various Asian movies and TV dramas on different roles, most prominently as taxis (especially in Hong Kong) as well as police cars. In Japanese movies and TV shows they were used as civilian vehicles, taxis as well as police cars; notably appearing in the crime dramas Taitokai (大都会 in Japanese) and Seibu Keisatsu (西部警察) (1979–1984). The Cedric was used as police vehicles alongside the Laurel and the Gloria, with most of them being wrecked in Seibu Keisatsu with the exception of the 430 model Cedrics that were used as marked police cars. A 1963 model appears in the film The Big Steal, as the car given to the protagonist by his parents.

References

External links

 Planet Cedric
 Nissan Sedan history (japanese site)
RatDat.com – paint colors, sales brochures, and model names

Cedric
Cars introduced in 1960

1970s cars
1980s cars
1990s cars
2000s cars
2010s cars
Executive cars
Sedans
Coupés
Station wagons
Taxi vehicles
Vehicles with CVT transmission